Valentine is a studio album by American jazz guitarist Bill Frisell. The album was released on 14 August 2020 by Blue Note. This is his second release on the label.

Reception
Thom Jurek of AllMusic stated, "Valentine is a portrait of this trio at a creative peak. While not the liveliest record in Frisell's catalog, it is one of his most inquiring, rhythmically inventive, and lyrical. Given his voluminous discography, that's saying plenty." Ian Patterson of All About Jazz noted, "With Valentine, Frisell, Royston and Morgan revel in the tight but loose interplay that is a hallmark of the best groups, plying a course as deeply lyrical as it is adventurous. Feels like the beginning of a great adventure." Jazz Journal review by Elliot Marlow-Stevens commented, "Valentine represents the more reserved, gentle approach to music that he demonstrated on albums like 1992’s Have a Little Faith. Nonetheless, it is still a highly original album, delivered with the ability and skill of a veteran jazz guitarist." Jake Cole in his review for Spectrum Culture stated, "A breezy combination of blues, folk and jazz, Frisell’s latest is the sound of a maestro gently flexing his immense skills." Chris Pearson of The Times wrote, "Bill Frisell has been exploring the fringes of jazz guitar so much lately that a trio album arrives as a bold departure. Yet the familiar elements remain: nostalgia, solitude and contemplation cloaked in an atmosphere of dead-of-night tranquillity."

Track listing

Personnel
Bill Frisell – guitars 
Thomas Morgan – bass 
Rudy Royston – drums

References

External links

2020 albums
Bill Frisell albums
Blue Note Records albums